Ophiacodon (meaning "snake tooth") is an extinct genus of synapsid belonging to the family Ophiacodontidae that lived from the Late Carboniferous to the Early Permian in North America and Europe. The genus was named along with its type species O. mirus by paleontologist Othniel Charles Marsh in 1878 and currently includes five other species. As an ophiacodontid, Ophiacodon is one of the most basal synapsids and is close to the evolutionary line leading to mammals.

Description

Ophiacodon has a large skull with a deep snout. The jaws are lined with many small teeth.

Specimens of Ophiacodon vary greatly in size. These differences in size were once used to distinguish species, but are now recognized as ontogenetic variations related to the ages of individuals. Smaller bones often have more poorly developed joint surfaces than larger bones, implying that they come from juvenile individuals while the larger bones come from adults. Analysis of the histology or microscopic anatomy of bones suggests that differences in size represent different growth stages rather than different species.

Range
Remains of Ophiacodon have been found in North America and Europe.
 England: Kenilworth - Cisuralian
 France: Lower Permian of Autun
 Canada: 
 (?)Nova Scotia: Joggins Formation - Kasimovian
 United States:
 Arizona: Cutler Formation - Cisuralian
 Colorado: Cutler Formation - Cisuralian
 Kansas: Fort Riley, Chase Group - Cisuralian
 New Mexico: Cutler Formation - Cisuralian
 Ohio: Greene Formation, Dunkard Group Cisuralian
 Oklahoma: Ada Formation - Pennsylvanian, Clyde Formation, Wellington Formation - Cisuralian
 Texas: Admiral Formation, Belle Plains Formation, Clyde Formation, Wichita Group - Cisuralian
 Utah: Cutler Formation - Cisuralian

Paleobiology

Ophiacodon most likely lived on land, but paleontologists have sometimes thought that it was semi-aquatic. An aquatic habitat for Ophiacodon was first proposed by paleontologist E. C. Case in 1907, although he later dismissed the idea. Anatomical features suggesting that it spent much of its time in the water include broad claws that seemed to be adaptations for paddling, thin jaws and numerous small teeth that seemed to be adapted for eating fish, and weakly developed bones, which are seen in many other secondarily aquatic tetrapods. In 1940, paleontologists Alfred Romer and Llewellyn Ivor Price proposed that hindlimbs with a greater length than forelimbs was another aquatic adaptation of Ophiacodon, supposedly because the hindlimbs would have been used to propel it through water. Several of these features are no longer thought to be evidence of an aquatic lifestyle; for example, broad claws are seen in most early tetrapods, even those that are known to have been almost exclusively terrestrial, and the long hindlimbs of Ophiacodon would not have been an effective means of propulsion because the feet were still relatively small and had little surface area over which to form a paddle. Analysis of the vertebrae of Ophiacodon indicate that it was most likely terrestrial and spent little time in water. A paleobiological inference model for the femur likewise suggests a terrestrial lifestyle for Ophiacodon, even though the rather thick cortex might also suggest amphibious, rather than truly terrestrial habits.

Skeletons of Ophiacodon show a fast growth pattern called fibrolamellar bone (FLB), suggesting at least partial warm-bloodedness. The FLB pattern is also found in birds and mammals.

References

Ophiacodontids
Prehistoric synapsid genera
Carboniferous synapsids
Cisuralian synapsids of Europe
Cisuralian synapsids of North America
Carboniferous North America
Permian North America
Pennsylvanian genus first appearances
Cisuralian genus extinctions
Taxa named by Othniel Charles Marsh
Fossil taxa described in 1878